Michael Spiteri (born 25 February 1969) is a retired Maltese football defender.

References

1969 births
Living people
Maltese footballers
Hibernians F.C. players
Birkirkara F.C. players
Association football defenders
Malta international footballers